Lithosia clarivenata is a moth of the subfamily Arctiinae. It was described by Reich in 1937. It is found in China.

References

 Natural History Museum Lepidoptera generic names catalog

Lithosiina
Moths described in 1937